Grevillea granulosa is a species of flowering plant in the family Proteaceae and is endemic to the south-west of Western Australia. It is a low, spreading shrub with linear leaves and red to orange flowers in clusters of up to eight.

Description

Taxonomy
Grevillea granulosa was first formally described in 1986 by Donald McGillivray in his book New Names in Grevillea (Proteaceae), based on specimens collected by Alison Marjorie Ashby between Mullewa and Pindar in 1965. The specific epithet (granulosa) means "abounding in small grains", referring to the leaf surface.

Distribution and habitat
This grevillea grows in shrubland, mallee scrub, or woodland in the area between Wubin, Lake Moore and Yuna in the Avon Wheatbelt, Geraldton Sandplains and Yuna biogeographic regions of south-western Western Australia.

Conservation status
Grevillea granulosa is classified as "Priority Three" by the Government of Western Australia Department of Biodiversity, Conservation and Attractions, meaning that it is poorly known and known from only a few locations but is not under imminent threat.

References

granulosa
Proteales of Australia
Eudicots of Western Australia
Plants described in 1986
Taxa named by Donald McGillivray